Shifrin, Shiffrin and Schifrin is a matronymic Jewish surname of Yiddish origin. Notable people with the surname include:

 Avraham Shifrin, Soviet-born human rights activist, Zionist, author, lawyer, and Israeli politician
 David Shifrin, American classical clarinetist
 Eduard Shifrin, Ukraine-born billionaire 
 Efim Shifrin, Russian actor and comedian
 Eleonora Shifrin, Soviet-born Israeli politician
 Karin Shifrin, Israeli opera singer
 Lalo Schifrin, Argentine pianist and composer
 Mikaela Shiffrin, American alpine skier
 Peter Schifrin, American Olympic fencer and sculptor
 Richard Shiffrin, American psychologist
 Seana Shiffrin, American philosopher
 Seymour Shifrin, American composer

See also 
 Anya Schiffrin

See also 
 Mitchell Shifrin
 Barbara Shifrin

Jewish surnames
Matronymic surnames